Basudev Ghimire is a Nepalese politician, belonging to the CPN (UML) currently serving as the member of the 2nd Federal Parliament of Nepal. In the 2022 Nepalese general election, he won the election from Rupandehi 5 (constituency).

References

Living people
Nepal MPs 2022–present
1968 births